Rubona is a town in the Western Region of Uganda.

Location
The geographical coordinates of Rubona are: 0°33'35.0"N, 30°10'44.0"E (Latitude:0.559722; Longitude:30.178889).

Population
The national population census and household survey conducted during August 2014, enumerated the population of Rubona Town Council at 5,627 people.

Points of interest
The farm is owned by the government of Uganda and is managed by the National Animal Genetic Resources Centre & Data Bank (NAGRC & DB), an institution of the Uganda Ministry of Agriculture, Animal Industry and Fisheries.

See also
 Kibiito
 Rwimi
 Adolf Mwesige

References

External links
 Map of Rubona Town Council, Bunyangabu District, Western Region, Uganda

 
Populated places in Western Region, Uganda